Patrick "Pat" MacAdam (15 September 1934 – 19 May 2015) was a Canadian writer and longtime Conservative Party insider born in Glace Bay, Nova Scotia. He died in Ottawa on 19 May 2015 after a years long battle with cancer.

Early and political life 
MacAdam attended St. Francis Xavier University, in Antigonish, Nova Scotia from 1952 until 1956. He served as the editor-in-chief of the student newspaper The Xaverian Weekly in 1955, the same year he met longtime friend Brian Mulroney when Mulroney was a freshman and MacAdam was a senior.

MacAdam would serve as a political advisor to Mulroney during his term as Prime Minister of Canada, taking a job at the High Commission of Canada in London. After Mulroney's term ended in 1993, MacAdam was accused of tax evasion, and eventually convicted in 1997.

Writing
In addition to a weekly column in the Ottawa Sun, MacAdam wrote several books:
 The record speaks! (1961)
 Unbelievable Canadian War Stories (2006)
 "Big Cy" and Other Characters: Pat MacAdam's Cape Breton (2006), nominated for a Stephen Leacock Award in 2007.
 Gold Medal Misfits (2007) 
 Mulroney's Man: Memoirs and Misadventures of an Ottawa Insider (2008)

References 

 John Sawatsky, Mulroney: The Politics of Ambition (Macfarlane Walter & Ross, 1991). An early chapter on Mulroney's freshman year at StFX in 1955 talks about his friendship with Pat MacAdam, then editor-in-chief of the Xaverian.

Canadian non-fiction writers
St. Francis Xavier University alumni
1934 births
2015 deaths